Clyde Blowers Capital is a Scottish industrial investment company which owns several engineering companies. Its products include shipbuilding, hydraulics, pumps and electrical machines. It is led by Jim McColl.

Subsidiary companies
Reference
 Allrig
 Cone Drive
 David Brown Santasalo
 Hydreco Hydraulics
 KETO pumps
 Moventas
 Parsons Peebles

References

Companies based in South Lanarkshire